Sir Richard Warburton (died 1610) was an English politician who sat in the House of Commons  between  1601 and 1610.

Warburton was the third son of Peter Warburton of Hefferston Grange in Weaversham, Cheshire and his wife Alice Cooper, daughter of John Cooper of Abbots Bromley, Staffordshire. He was educated at Clement's Inn and then at Lincoln's Inn in 1583. He was a gentleman pensioner from around 1592 until his death. In 1600 he was Constable of Lancaster Castle and steward of Lonsdale hundred. In 1601, he was elected Member of Parliament for Bridport. He was knighted in 1603. In 1604 he was elected MP for Penryn and sat until his death in 1610. 
 
Warburton married Anne Vavasour, the niece of Anne Vavasour, lady of the bedchamber to Queen Elizabeth I and sister of Thomas Vavasour in about 1603.

References

Year of birth missing
1610 deaths
Members of the pre-1707 English Parliament for constituencies in Cornwall
Members of Lincoln's Inn
People from Bridport
People from Penryn, Cornwall
English MPs 1601
English MPs 1604–1611